Eline Roebers (born 2006) is a Dutch chess International Master. She is the reigning Dutch Youth Champion in the open division. Roebers was the 2020 online World Youth Champion in the under-14 girls' division, and was the first Dutch player to win a World Youth Championship in any category. Roebers began playing chess at age seven and she has been coached by Dutch International Master Robert Ris. Her father Jan is a FIDE Master (FM). She won an individual bronze medal on the second board at the European Women's Team Championship in 2021.

Chess career

2021
Roebers won the Brugse Meesters in Belgium in August 2021, finishing in joint first with a score of 7½/9 and having the better tiebreak criteria.

2022
She also became the youngest player and first woman to win the Untergrombach Open in Germany in January 2022, defeating Russian Grandmaster Vyacheslav Ikonnikov in the final round to finish in clear first with a score of 6½/7. In 2022, Roebers played board 1 for Dutch women at the 44th Chess Olympiad in Chennai, with a score of 7.5/10 (+6-1=3)  and a TPR of 2532 which earned her an individual silver medal for her board 1 performance.

2023
As the lowest-rated player in the tournament, she defeated GM Erwin L'Ami in the Tata Steel Challengers 2023 tournament in the 2nd round after losing the first round to prodigy Abhimanyu Mishra.

Notable game

Roebers vs. L'Ami, Tata Steel (Challengers), 2023. Against a 2600-rated Grandmaster, Roebers sacrificed her queen on move 35 (diagram), regaining a number of pieces and forcing resignation 11 moves later.

References

Notes 

Living people
2006 births
Dutch female chess players
Sportspeople from Amsterdam